Viena and the Fantomes is an American musical romantic drama film, written and directed by Gerardo Naranjo. It stars Dakota Fanning, Jeremy Allen White, Frank Dillane, Olivia Luccardi, Sarah Steele, Philip Ettinger, Ryan LeBeouf, Caleb Landry Jones, Zoë Kravitz and Evan Rachel Wood.

It was released on June 30, 2020, by Universal Pictures.

Plot
A roadie travels across the United States with a punk band during the 1980s.

Cast
 Dakota Fanning as Viena
 Jeremy Allen White as Freddy
 Frank Dillane as Keyes
 Olivia Luccardi as Rebecca
 Sarah Steele as Loona
 Philip Ettinger as Boyer
 Ryan LeBeouf as Paul
 Caleb Landry Jones as Albert
 Zoë Kravitz as Midge
 Evan Rachel Wood as Susi
 Jon Bernthal as Monroe

Production
Production on the film began in 2014 in Las Vegas, Nevada, with Gerardo Naranjo making his English-language debut from a screenplay he wrote. The film ultimately was delayed until 2020, due to the filmmakers wanting the "perfect" edit.

Release
The film was released through video on demand on June 30, 2020, by Universal Pictures.

Critical reception

References

External links
 
 

2020 films
American musical drama films
American romantic drama films
American romantic musical films
Films shot in Nevada
Universal Pictures films
Films about musical groups
American road movies
2020s English-language films
2020s American films